The 2001 Masters Tournament was the 65th Masters Tournament, held April 5–8 at Augusta National Golf Club in Augusta, Georgia. Tiger Woods won his second Masters and sixth major championship, two strokes ahead of runner-up David Duval.

This championship marked the completion of the "Tiger Slam," with Woods holding all four major titles, having won the U.S. Open, Open Championship, and PGA Championship in 2000. In addition to the four majors, he was also the reigning champion of the Players Championship (March) and the WGC-NEC Invitational (August, second of three consecutive).

Course

Field
1. Masters champions
Tommy Aaron, Seve Ballesteros, Gay Brewer, Billy Casper, Charles Coody, Fred Couples (10,16,17), Ben Crenshaw, Nick Faldo (11), Raymond Floyd, Doug Ford, Bernhard Langer, Sandy Lyle, Larry Mize, Jack Nicklaus, José María Olazábal (12,16,17), Mark O'Meara (3), Arnold Palmer, Gary Player, Vijay Singh (4,11,14,16,17), Craig Stadler, Tom Watson, Tiger Woods (2,3,4,5,10,11,12,13,14,16,17), Ian Woosnam, Fuzzy Zoeller
George Archer, Jack Burke Jr., Bob Goalby, Herman Keiser, Byron Nelson, Sam Snead, and Art Wall Jr. did not play.

2. U.S. Open champions (last five years)
Ernie Els (10,11,13,14,16,17), Lee Janzen, Steve Jones

3. The Open champions (last five years)
Paul Lawrie, Tom Lehman (10,13,14,16,17), Justin Leonard (14,16,17)

4. PGA champions (last five years)
Mark Brooks, Davis Love III (10,14,15,16,17)

5. The Players Championship winners (last three years)
David Duval (10,11,14,16,17), Hal Sutton (10,14,16,17)

6. U.S. Amateur champion and runner-up
James Driscoll (a), Jeff Quinney (a)

7. The Amateur champion
Mikko Ilonen (a)

8. U.S. Amateur Public Links champion
D. J. Trahan (a)

9. U.S. Mid-Amateur champion
Greg Puga (a)

10. Top 16 players and ties from the 2000 Masters
Carlos Franco (14,16,17), Jim Furyk (14,16,17), John Huston (11,14,16,17), Phil Mickelson (14,16,17), Greg Norman (16,17), Dennis Paulson (17), Chris Perry (14,16,17), Nick Price (14,16,17), Loren Roberts (11,14,16,17)

11. Top eight players and ties from the 2000 U.S. Open
Stewart Cink (14,16,17), Pádraig Harrington (16,17), Miguel Ángel Jiménez (16,17)
Lee Westwood (16,17) did not play.

12. Top four players and ties from 2000 PGA Championship
Stuart Appleby (14,16,17), Thomas Bjørn (13,16,17), Greg Chalmers, Bob May (14,16,17)

13. Top four players and ties from the 2000 Open Championship
David Toms (14,16,17)

14. Top 40 players from the 2000 PGA Tour money list
Robert Allenby (16,17), Paul Azinger (16,17), Notah Begay III (16,17), Mark Calcavecchia (16,17), Chris DiMarco, Steve Flesch (16,17), Scott Hoch (16), Jonathan Kaye, Franklin Langham, Steve Lowery, Jeff Maggert (16), Shigeki Maruyama (16), Rocco Mediate (16,17), Jesper Parnevik (16,17), Rory Sabbatini, Tom Scherrer, Kirk Triplett (16,17), Scott Verplank (16,17), Grant Waite, Duffy Waldorf (16,17), Mike Weir (16,17)

15. Top 3 players from the 2001 PGA Tour money list on March 4
Joe Durant, Steve Stricker (17)

16. Top 50 players from the final 2000 world ranking
Ángel Cabrera (17), Michael Campbell (17), Darren Clarke (17), José Cóceres, Pierre Fulke (17), Sergio García (17), Retief Goosen (17), Dudley Hart (17), Colin Montgomerie (17), Eduardo Romero (17)

17. Top 50 players from world ranking published March 4
Brad Faxon, Toshimitsu Izawa

18. Special foreign invitation
Aaron Baddeley, Shingo Katayama

All the amateurs were playing in their first Masters, as were Greg Chalmers, José Cóceres, Chris DiMarco, Steve Flesch, Pierre Fulke, Toshimitsu Izawa, Shingo Katayama, Jonathan Kaye, Franklin Langham, Bob May, Eduardo Romero, Rory Sabbatini, and Tom Scherrer. Aaron Baddeley made his first appearance as a professional.

Round summaries

First round
Thursday, April 5, 2001

The round was headlined by the tournament-low 65 (−7) shot by Chris DiMarco, which gave him a one stroke lead after day one in his Masters debut. Steve Stricker and Ángel Cabrera shot six-under 66s to tie for second. Three players (John Huston, Phil Mickelson, Lee Janzen) formed a tie for fourth at 67. The scoring was very good throughout the leaderboard as 14 players shot in the 60s on day one and 32 players were in red figures. Tiger Woods, looking to win all four major championships in a row in two different calendar years, shot a two-under 70 to put him in a six-way tie for 15th. Defending champion Vijay Singh shot a 69 (−3).

Second round
Friday, April 6, 2001

Chris DiMarco added to his one-stroke first round lead with a 69 (-3) to give him a two-stroke lead at 134 (-10) after 36-holes. However, the round was headlined by the owner of last three major championships; Tiger Woods bolted up the leaderboard into a tie for second place with a 66 (-6). Phil Mickelson shot a 69 to equal Woods in second place. David Duval who was looking for his first Masters championship after three straight top 10 finishes at Augusta matched Woods's 66, and put himself among five golfers tied for fourth at 137 (-7), which included two-time U.S. Open champion, Lee Janzen. Two-time champion José María Olazábal was among a three-way tie for ninth at 138 (-6). The cut was set at 145 (+1), with notable players Sergio García, Davis Love III, and Thomas Bjørn off for the weekend.

Amateurs: Driscoll (+2), Ilonen (+7), Trahan (+9), Puga (+12), Quinney (+12).

Third round
Saturday, April 7, 2001

Tiger Woods had his second straight round in the 60s, with a four-under 68, to take the 54-hole lead at -12, and to move within 18 holes of winning all four majors in a row. Phil Mickelson put himself in the best position to foil Tiger's quest with a three-under 69 to trail by only one stroke going to the final round. The leader of the first two rounds, Chris DiMarco shot an even par 72 to fall into third place. The 1989 British Open champion, Mark Calcavecchia, shot a four-under 68 to tie DiMarco for third. Ernie Els, also shot a four-under 68, to move up the leaderboard to -9 and a tie for fifth place. Rocco Mediate shot the round of the day with a six-under 66 to put himself at -8 and a tie for eighth place. At the close of the round 31 players were under par for the championship.

Final round
Sunday, April 8, 2001

Summary
For the first time in the modern era a golfer was able to win all four of golf's major championships in a row. However, since they were all not won in the same calendar year, the feat was dubbed the Tiger Slam. Only Bobby Jones, in 1930, under a different major championship structure was able to win all four in the same year. Woods shot his third straight round in the 60s with his second consecutive four-under 68 to complete the tournament at -16. The only golfer to make a serious charge at Woods was David Duval who matched the round of the day with a five-under 67. Duval briefly tied for the lead when he birdied the par 5 15th. Unfortunately for him, Duval would give the shot right back on the par 3 16th. Needing a birdie on the final hole, Duval missed a birdie-putt to allow Woods to only need to par the final hole. For good measure, Woods would birdie the hole to win his second green jacket and sixth major championship. It was another hard luck finish for Duval, who finished in the top 10 for the fourth consecutive Masters and it was his second, second-place finish.

Phil Mickelson was briefly in contention on the back nine, but was not able to match Woods and Duval with a two-under 70 for the round. It was another disappointing major for Mickelson who earned his 12th top 10 finish, but was still without a major championship. Japan's Toshimitsu Izawa matched Duval's round of the day with a 67 of his own to finish in a tie for fourth with Mark Calcavecchia at -10. Two-time Masters champion, Bernhard Langer, was among a four-way tie for sixth at -9 that also included two-time U.S. Open champion, Ernie Els. The leader of the first two rounds, Chris DiMarco, shot a two-over 74 to finish a disappointing tie for tenth.

Final leaderboard

Scorecard

Cumulative tournament scores, relative to par
{|class="wikitable" span = 50 style="font-size:85%;
|-
|style="background: Red;" width=10|
|Eagle
|style="background: Pink;" width=10|
|Birdie
|style="background: PaleGreen;" width=10|
|Bogey
|}
Source:

Notes
This was the final Masters for former champions Gay Brewer (age 69), Billy Casper (69), and Doug Ford (78). Because of consistent poor performances, they were asked not to participate in 2002.

References

External links
Masters.com – past winners and results
Augusta.com – 2001 Masters leaderboard and scorecards
Coverage on the European Tour's official site
Full results

2001
2001 in golf
2001 in American sports
2001 in sports in Georgia (U.S. state)
April 2001 sports events in the United States